Angela Rye (born October 26, 1979) is the Principal and CEO of IMPACT Strategies, a political advocacy firm formerly based in Washington, DC. She is a special correspondent on ESPN.

She was (until November 2020) a liberal political commentator on CNN.

She briefly served as the executive director and general counsel to the Congressional Black Caucus for the 112th Congress.

She formerly helped steer the boards of the Congressional Black Caucus Institute, Congressional Black Caucus Political Action Committee, Seattle University School of Law Alumni, and Women in Entertainment Empowerment Network. She serves as a senior advisor to the Government Technology and Services Coalition and is a member of The Links, Incorporated.

Early life
Rye grew up in the Madison Park section of Seattle, Washington. Raised Catholic, she graduated from Seattle's all-girls Holy Names Academy, the University of Washington, and Seattle University School of Law.

Career 
Rye began her career in legislative advocacy at the National Association for Equal Opportunity in Higher Education, an umbrella association of 120 historically black colleges and universities in the United States. Here, she served as the Coordinator of Advocacy and Legislative Affairs. Prior to this, she worked in district office of Congresswoman Maxine Waters (D-CA) and served as the Western Region Director of the National Black Law Students Association.

Upon moving to Washington, DC, Rye joined IMPACT, an organization founded prior to her arrival by husband and wife attorneys Joe Briggs and Kendra Davis Briggs as well as policy advisor David Johns, who served as director from 2007 to 2013. IMPACT aimed to encourage young professionals in economic empowerment, civic engagement, and political involvement. The group later invited Rye, and along with her membership IMPACT formed partnerships with the National Bar Association, Congressional Black Caucus Foundation, National Urban League, Rainbow/PUSH, Congressional Black Caucus Political Education and Leadership Institute, Black Leadership Forum, and many other organizations.

Rye is one of few recurring guests on The Breakfast Club radio show. On December 6, 2016, She was invited to the broadcast by  Charlamagne The God (real name Lenard McKelvey) after he received backlash from tweeting he wished women of color had a platform "like Tomi Lahren did". Rye and McKelvey formerly co-hosted a podcast that received mixed reviews and last aired in June 2019. In January 2017, she made her first appearance on The Breakfast Club and frequented the show regularly, often discussing Trump administration and other pop culture topics. She last appeared on the radio show in February 2022.

She also served as a senior advisor to the House Committee on Homeland security, where she helped develop the general political strategy, focusing on modernizing government contracting practices and opening doors of opportunity for small businesses. She then served as the executive director and General Counsel to the Congressional Black Caucus for the 112th Congress. During her brief time as director, she was "tasked with developing the overall legislative and political strategy for the Caucus". Rye left her role at CBC after just over a year, though she formerly held an affiliation with the CBC institute. She stated via a 2020 Instagram Live question and answer session that she has never practiced law.

Rye was a political commentator for CNN but was released by the network shortly before the 2020 presidential election. She has been featured as an on-air personality on several media outlets, including HuffPost Live, TV One, and BET.

She appeared in Grownish S3 Ep11 "Alright" as herself.

ESPN announced Rye was hired as a special correspondent to provide perspective on sports-related matters of race, culture, and social justice issues.

Opinions
Rye received widespread backlash after she defended podcast co-host Charlamagne Tha God (Lenard McKelvey) against resurfaced rape allegations.  In comments under her own Instagram post she referred to his alleged victim, who was 15 at the time of the assault, as "broke" and "looking for a come-up." Rye insisted publicly on McKelvey's innocence (while citing his personal account of the assault in his 2017 published memoir as the "evidence" exonerating him) though he pled guilty in the case to contributing to the delinquency of a minor. McKelvey also admitted on air to raping his then girlfriend (now wife, Jessica Gadsden) while she was passed out and inebriated. Many #MeToo advocates have been critical of her repeated attempts to silence and discredit sexual assault victims while claiming that "no physical evidence" connects McKelvey to the incident, which is untrue. Nevertheless, Rye has spoken candidly about her "privilege" regarding the #MeToo movement, saying she was treated "almost like a daughter" despite having primarily worked for male lawmakers on Capitol Hill. She has stated that her decision to pursue law was partly driven by an unwanted and inappropriate encounter with an athlete, leading her to abandon her initial goal of becoming a sports agent. 

Rye has said that statues of George Washington and Thomas Jefferson, like those of Robert E. Lee, should be taken down because they were slave owners.

References

External links 
 
 
 Chartwell Speakers Profile
 
 

1979 births
21st-century American women
American political commentators
American women chief executives
CNN people
Living people
People from Seattle
Seattle University School of Law alumni
University of Washington alumni
Washington (state) Democrats